Wlad Godzich  (Władysław Bogusz Godzich, Wladyslaw Bogusz Godzich) (born May 13, 1945 in Germany, raised in France) is a literary critic, literary theorist, translator, and scholar. He is attributed with influencing the conceptualization of modern literary critical theory. He currently serves as Professor of general and comparative literature, and critical studies at the University of California, Santa Cruz.

Career
Godzich has published and translated several books, edited eight collections of essays, and authored over a hundred scholarly articles, lectures, and papers. In 2000, Godzich joined the University of California, Santa Cruz as dean of Humanities. Prior to this, he was Professor of English (Chair of Emergent Literatures), Comparative Literature, and European Studies at the University of Geneva and professor of Comparative literature at Université de Montréal. He has also held visiting appointments at the University of Silesia (Poland), the Catholic University of Rio de Janeiro (Brazil), Harvard University, and the University of Zurich.

At the University of Minnesota, he was the director of the Office of Research Development, director of the comparative literature program, director of the Center for Humanistic Studies, and coordinator of their international program in Dakar, Senegal.

Organizer of dozens of international conferences, he also acts as consultant to many university presses and organizers of university programs in the Americas and Europe. He sits on the editorial board of multiple American, European and Asian journals, both print and electronic. His research grants have been primarily from US, Canadian, Swedish, Swiss and private agencies.

Work in the 1980s
Through his work at the University of Minnesota Press, Godzich brought important works of critical theory into English translation. His essays during this period were well received by critics as they were among the first to link deconstruction, cultural criticism, and third-world literatures through linguistics:

they can now be seen as tesserae composing a theoretical mosaic of remarkable scope. The patterns of his thought emerge from his interest in the relationship between language and literacy-the latter conceived as "a determinate set of relations that we have to language." Godzich reinvigorates the semiological project proposed by Saussure but forsaken by his heirs: that of exploring the social functioning of language in its historical and rhetorical actualizations.

Selected works
The Emergence of Prose: An Essay in Prosaics (Minnesota, 1987)
Philosophie einer un-europäischen Literaturkritik (Fink, 1989)
Crisis of Institutionalized Literature in Spain (Minnesota, 1991)
The Culture of Literacy (Harvard University Press, 1994)

See also
 Critical theory
 Literary theory
 New Historicism
 Yale school (deconstruction)
 Tzvetan Todorov
 Paul de Man

References

External links
 UCSC Faculty - Wlad Godzich
 Google Books - List of Wlad Godzich's publications
 goodreads - Wlad Godzich

Literature educators
Critical theorists
American literary theorists
Comparative literature academics
Harvard University staff
University of California, Santa Cruz faculty
Columbia University alumni
Polish emigrants to the United States
Living people
1945 births
American literary critics